Ronald Guinness Orr Gunion, known as Ronald Orr (6 August 1876 – 21 March 1924) was a Scottish footballer, who played for Newcastle United and Liverpool amongst others in the early 20th century. He played twice for Scotland in 1902 and 1904, scoring one goal.

Club career

Born in Bartonholm (by Kilwinning), Ayrshire, Orr was an inside forward who played for Kilwinning Eglinton, Glossop North End and St Mirren. Orr scored 32 goals in 67 matches for St. Mirren and was snapped up by Newcastle United as a result, signing him in May 1901. He scored twice on his home debut at St James‘ Park, something he would become familiar for. He scored a brace 13 times, nine in the league, only managing a single hat-trick, four against Notts County in October 1901. Orr enjoyed success during his seven seasons on Tyneside, winning the League Championship twice in 1905 and 1907. However, in the FA Cup, he was not selected for their 1905 FA Cup Final defeat to Aston Villa, despite having scored 4 goals in 6 of their cup ties on the way. More disappointment again when Newcastle lost the 1906 FA Cup Final 1-0 against Everton, who had scored 4 goals in 7 cup ties this time.

Orr also earned two full international caps for Scotland whilst with Newcastle, scoring on his debut in a 2-2 draw against England at Villa Park on 3 May 1902, in the British Home Championship. His other appearance was also against England, the Scots losing 1-0 at Celtic Park on 9 April 1904, again in the British Home Championship.

After a successful period at Newcastle, Orr joined Liverpool in April 1908, when manager Tom Watson paid £350 for his transfer. He made his debut in a Football League Division One match at Villa Park against Aston Villa on 4 April 1908, bagging his first goal in the same match. Orr kept up his goalscoring exploits the following season, finishing as the Reds' top scorer with 20 goals from his 33 league starts. None more as important as his last goal on the final day. Liverpool needed a point to avoid relegation, the last day saw Orr and his teammates travel to St James’s Park to play Newcastle, league champions for third time in five years. Orr scored the only goal of the game after 78 minutes, saving Liverpool from relegation against his former club. Orr played 7 matches in what would be his last season at Liverpool, shortened after an injury in the Merseyside derby at Goodison Park in September 1911. He left in January 1912, returning to Scotland to play for Raith Rovers. He was back in the Northeast the next season, this time on South Tyneside after signing for South Shields in the North Eastern League. The First World War effectively ended his career, although he did make guest appearances for Fulham. Upon returning home to Scotland, there it was reported that he had died on 21 March 1924 in Kilwinning, aged only 47.

International career
Having scored in a Home Scots v Anglo-Scots international trial match, Orr was selected to make his Scotland debut on 3 May 1902 in a British Home Championship match against England, and he scored to put his side two goals up in an eventual 2–2 draw; like his debut goal for Liverpool, it was at Villa Park (this match was replayed from the original fixture at Ibrox Park, where a stand collapsed, killing 25 spectators and injuring hundreds). His second and last cap was also against England two years later, this time a 1–0 defeat.

Career statistics 
League Goals and Appearances by club, season and competition.

Honours
Newcastle United
Football League First Division: 1904–05, 1906–07
FA Cup: runner-up 1906

References

External links
Player profile at LFChistory.net

1876 births
1924 deaths
St Mirren F.C. players
Newcastle United F.C. players
Glossop North End A.F.C. players
Liverpool F.C. players
Raith Rovers F.C. players
South Shields F.C. (1889) players
Scottish footballers
Scotland international footballers
Association football inside forwards
Scottish Junior Football Association players
Scottish Football League players
English Football League players
Fulham F.C. wartime guest players
Footballers from North Ayrshire
FA Cup Final players
People from Kilwinning